A Band in Upperworld is the first live album and the third release by French progressive metal band Adagio.

Track listing 
 "Introitus" – 1:22
 "Second Sight" – 6:07
 "Chosen" – 8:43
 "The Stringless Violin" – 6:32
 "From My Sleep... to Someone Else" – 7:47
 "Promises" – 5:14
 "The Seven Lands of Sin" – 14:02
 "Panem et Circences" (Japanese edition bonus track) – 6:18
 "In Nomine..." – 6:24

Personnel 
Kevin Codfert – keyboard
Stéphan Forté – guitar
Franck Hermanny – bass
Eric Lebailles – drums
David Readman – vocals

Adagio (band) albums
2004 live albums